Travis Manawa is a fictional character in the first three seasons of the television series Fear the Walking Dead portrayed by Cliff Curtis. The character is a former English teacher who is dealing with the fallout in addition to a divorce and a resentful son.

Character biography
Travis is a good-natured man and loving father. He is a protective, pragmatic and resolute individual who holds a firm personal conviction that everything can be fixed, one way or another. He has been described as "the one character who desperately tries to cling to his humanity ... the one person who believes that there is always a way to repair something that is broken and that a corner will always be turned  ... [and] a good man trying to do right by everyone in his life". He holds a strong belief that civilization will eventually be rebuilt. It is revealed during Season 1 he is also an ex U.S. Marine.

Season 1

After Nick finds his girlfriend eating a corpse, he is hit by a car and hospitalized. Travis initially thinks that Nick's claims about the incident are heroin hallucinations, but he believes Nick after visiting the church himself. Nick escapes from the hospital and meets with Calvin, hoping to learn if the drugs Calvin sold him caused him to hallucinate in the church. Calvin tries to kill Nick to prevent being exposed as a drug dealer or impugning the quality of his drugs. In the ensuing struggle, Calvin is mortally shot. After Travis and Madison arrive, the zombified Calvin attacks them. Nick runs over Calvin repeatedly with Travis' truck, and the three watch in disbelief as the mutilated Calvin is still able to turn his head towards them. Nick, Madison, and Travis choose to flee to the desert. The group returns to Madison's home to gather supplies. Travis tells Madison to take the kids to the desert without him; he will catch up. The group inside the barbershop remains trapped, while the riot outside intensifies. While a riot rages, a mob sets fire to the store adjoining the barbershop, forcing the Salazars and Manawas to flee. The group reaches Travis' truck and escapes, but not before Griselda is injured by a collapsing scaffold. Unable to reach a hospital, the group drives to Madison's house, where Nick, Madison, and Alicia temporarily flee. Nick leads Madison and Alicia to the Trans' house next door, where they take a shotgun. Travis arrives and is attacked by Mr. Dawson, who is shot and killed by Daniel. All three families decide to stay the night and evacuate in the morning. Nurse Liza tends to Griselda's injured foot but notes that she will die if not treated by a doctor. Ofelia tells Daniel they should flee with Travis, but he insists his family can survive alone and will join his cousin later. The next morning, as the Clarks and Manawas start driving away, the National Guard arrives and quarantines the block. While Travis says, "It's going to get better", Daniel laments that it's "too late", as he watches a guardsman mark the neighboring house. Days after the National Guard quarantines the neighborhood into a Safe Zone, residents try to live normally. Tensions build under military rule. Chris shows a video to Travis and Madison of a light signaling from the Dead Zone. Travis talks Doug into getting psychological help. Liza helps neighbors with their medical needs. Travis learns that Doug has been hospitalized for his mental issues. Dr. Exner determines that Liza is not technically a nurse. Soldiers take Griselda and Nick to a hospital, but Nick's family protests his departure. Liza agrees to go to assist the medical team despite not wanting to leave her son. Travis retreats to the roof and sees the signal from the Dead Zone. Seconds later, he hears gunfire followed by darkness. Chris is devastated that Liza left voluntarily to help at the hospital, but Travis promises to bring her back. Travis convinces Moyers' squad to take him to the hospital to check on his friends. While en route, Moyers encourages Travis to shoot a zombie, but Travis is emotionally unable to pull the trigger. The soldiers stop to assist another squad in a building infested by zombies, and most of those soldiers, including Moyers, are overcome. The few survivors flee and drop Travis off near the Safe Zone. He learns that Daniel tortured Adams into revealing what "Cobalt" means: in the morning, all civilians will be killed, and the guardsmen will evacuate the city. The group drives to the National Guard's headquarters to rescue Liza, Griselda, and Nick. Adams agrees to be their guide when let go by Travis. The group infiltrates the base after Daniel distracts the guards by leading a horde of walkers from the arena. Travis, Madison, Daniel, and Ofelia go inside, while Alicia and Chris stay behind. Meanwhile, the walkers breach the perimeter defenses and swarm the base. Travis' group reaches the holding cells and free the detainees before reuniting with Nick, Liza, and Strand. They try to escape through the medical ward, where they discover Dr. Exner has euthanized all of the patients. Dr. Exner tells them of an escape route before presumably committing suicide. Before they can escape, the group encounters Adams, who shoots Ofelia in the arm. Enraged, Travis brutally beats Adams and leaves him for dead. Strand leads the group to his oceanside mansion. On the beach, Liza reveals to Madison that she was bitten during the escape. Liza pleads with Madison and Travis to euthanize her before she turns. Travis promises to protect Chris before shooting Liza.

Season 2

Travis and the rest of the group get ready to board Victor Strand's yacht, the Abigail. During their trip, Strand's home is seen in flames, exploding, swarmed by the infected. Travis and Madison pack everything and prepare to leave the beach. Unfortunately, when he tries getting Chris (who is mourning his mother's death) on the zodiac, he says he is not leaving her. The infected soon appear. Travis and Madison throw rocks at them, killing them. Nick arrives in the zodiac and boards with Madison, Chris, and Liza's corpse. They head to the Abigail. The group freezes and silently witness Los Angeles engulfed in flames as the military bombs their former home. The following day Travis checks on Chris, who is in his room with his mother's corpse. When he goes outside and sees the Abigail has come across a raft of survivors, Alicia wants to help them, but Travis tells her to check the radio while he talks to Strand. Travis sees Madison and Strand arguing over him not wanting to stop the boat. Travis agrees with Strand as he informs them they are heading to San Diego. Travis and Madison argue over his agreement with Strand's decision, but he says his priority is the protection of his family. Later that day, everyone but Strand attends a burial at sea for Liza. Travis says some words before Chris angrily throws his mother's corpse overboard. Travis goes to Chris' room to comfort him, but he screams at him for shooting her before punching him.

Travis was forced to repair the boat as soon as possible, Travis dived under the boat to find an infected man stuck in the water intake. Affirming to Strand that the repair of this would take all day, Travis took care of the infected and continued with the repair of the water filter and then heard how Madison told him that he had found out from Daniel that Victor planned Mexico as a destination. Accepting with no option, Travis quickly finished repairing the water intake and interceded in letting two survivors stay on a raft moored to the yacht - after part of the group returned from searching a crashed plane - even knowing that Strand I'd drive them out somehow like it finally happened.

When a sudden bandit attack endangered everyone's lives, Travis and the group were taken by surprise and tied up, where they were at the mercy of a rude boy named Reed, who proved unscrupulous in acting. Travis was forced to teach the boy how to start the boat without the use of keys in order to save his son's life and did everything possible to prolong the start as well as to leave a metal bar hidden near his companions. Before the imminent arrival of the leader of the group, Travis lit the ship and Connor was presented with the news that he would take the man and Alicia with him and hooded he climbed aboard the pirate ship.

Travis and Alicia were transported to the bandits' refuge - a port on the coast and then locked in a cell. Upon awakening, Travis tried to escape but soon after received a visit from Alex, who informed him that he had forced himself to kill his friend to get him out of his suffering and that he blamed him for this fact by leaving them on a raft. The man then admitted to knowing what it felt like to have killed his son's mother to get her out of her misery. After receiving a visit from Alicia and Jack to inform him that they would escape, the man ordered him to escape without him and assured him that his mother was fine. However, Connor ended up taking it out of the place in order to use it as a trade currency for his brother. Reuniting with Madison on the dock, he observed how a zombified Reed bit Connor after the bag was taken from him and together with his beloved they fought against the remaining men to escape from the place, and then rescue Alicia from the water.

After they were all reunited back, the group chose to head towards Mexico and prepare to cross the border through the Strand contact. After having problems with some soldiers, which ended with them and Luis Flores dead, the group managed to reach Mexico where their lives were put at risk again after being forced to fight with a small horde of infected. After finishing with them, Travis and the others finally arrived at the Abigail farm, where they were greeted by Celia Flores. After learning from Madison that Chris had been willing to let Madison die in his encounter with the infected, Travis remained incredulous, but still begged Madison to support him in helping his son as he supported her at the time. help Nick. On the orders of his wife Travis slept with Chris.

After waking up and noticing the absence of his son, Travis was informed by Alicia how he appeared in her room ready to kill her and Madison. Having been denied help because of your son's actions, Travis went looking for his son in the middle of the night but ended up injuring his foot on the way when eliminating a walker. Unable to take another step, Travis entered a cabin and after a brief misunderstanding, he was treated with hospitality by the local man. Accepting a boots to avoid continuing to hurt his feet, the Maori noticed the presence of his son in the hut and observed how he threatened to kill a child to leave him alone. After struggling with the boy, Travis managed to paralyze him and realizing how bad his head was, he decided to stay alone with him to try to help him instead of going back to the others and asked Nick not to say anything to Madison when he found them.

Wandering aimlessly, Travis chatted about rebuilding civilization with his son, and after being forced to stop so he could rest, Christopher offered to fetch supplies from a nearby store. However, he ran into a group of strangers, for whom, at the orders of the young Manawa, Travis and his son fled the place in a hurry. Eventually, the bandits managed to locate Travis and Chris although to their surprise they invited them to be part of their group. Although Travis objected to continuing with the boys, his son instead argued that it was best to continue with a group and stay with them. After taking refuge in a nearby farm, the group was surprised by an armed farmer who tried to expel them from the place. After the man was provoked by the actions of his companions, he wounded James in the leg, so Travis watched in astonishment as his son coldly murdered the farmer.

Still in shock, Travis came to himself to save the life of the injured boy and later buried the farmer with his family. Concerned about Christopher's sociopathic attitude and wrong reasoning, Travis tried to convince him that the college kids weren't his friends, but savages, but instead this ended up causing the boy to convince himself that he was simply being stronger to survive. After James's injury began to become a burden on the group, Chris began to behave antagonistically against him by showing agreement with his new friends, so Travis went on the campaign to protect him in case his companions tried eliminate it just as they had done with the owner of the farm. However, his son, pretending to have understood the moral implications of his actions, approached him with the excuse of talking and managed to distract him long enough for Brandon and Derek to manage to reduce him at gunpoint and then kill the wounded boy who begged for mercy . Devastated by the harsh betrayal he had suffered, Travis tried to save his son once more from his doom, but the boy did not listen to reasons or show any remorse, and ended up leaving the farm along with his new comrades.

Alone and hurt by the abandonment of his son, Travis was in charge of burying James and later, he left the place forever. For days, Travis wandered aimlessly in the direction of the sea until in the dark, he noticed in the distance how the lights of a mysterious hotel turned on and off. Surprised by what he saw, the scruffy man continued on his way to the hotel.

Due to fate coincidences, Travis ended up meeting Madison and her stepdaughter at the hotel; so without wasting time he was allowed to enter the place and ended up lovingly hugging his girlfriend. Later, Travis was informed by Madison of Strand's presence at the scene and Nick's escape following the destruction of the Abigail vineyard. Without trusting anyone but his beloved, Travis decided to narrate the events that led him to that place; regretting not having kept her promise to Liza and feeling sorry for not telling her son how much she loved her. Giving in to the wishes of his beloved, Travis decided to take a shower in his room visibly affected.

After waking up from a small nap, Travis received a visit from Madison who affirmed that she would support him in everything he does and later; when Alicia brought him his food, the man apologized to the girl for not believing in her and protecting her as he should have previously. Deep in thought, Travis ended up hearing a crowd protesting and as he peeked out, the man realized that it was Brandon and Derek. Eager to be reunited with his son and despite Strand's attempts to stop him, Travis managed to catch up with them before Madison managed to expel them from the hotel, impatient to notice the absence of his only son, Travis begged the thugs to tell them what had happened with the. Brandon confessed that on the way they had suffered an accident with the vehicle and that Chris had been unable to survive the event. Destroyed upon learning of that incident, the man tried to find out where his body was; however, when Derek contradicted him by telling for Brandon; The Maori man realized that they were lying so he locked himself in the room and began to beat them until they confessed to killing him after being badly wounded. Full of anger, Travis attacked the youths and without a word began to beat him repeatedly until he killed them with his bare hands, injuring a resident who tried to intervene.

Totally exhausted and depressed by the events, Travis did not resist when the people at the hotel locked him up and planned to eject him for their safety. However, Madison interceded for her and told Elena to let her out of her confinement, for which the woman agreed on the condition that they leave the next day. Spending the night with his family and unable to sleep, Travis was comforted by Madison, who assured him that from now on he would have to kill again in the future to ensure the well-being of his loved ones. However, their quiet evening was interrupted by an angry Hector and Andres, who planned to kill Travis for murdering his brother. While he tried to calm the situation and ask them to take him out so that his family would not have to see, Alicia quickly stabbed Andres in the heart, so Travis reduced the others and they escaped from the hotel thanks to Strand, who preferred to stay at the hotel. place. Arriving at a supermarket looking for Nick's traces, a clue led them to a Colony completely invaded except for a dying man, who revealed that Nick had fled to the frontier.

Season 3

Travis, Madison and Alicia are captured by soldiers and taken to a military compound led by Troy Otto. Travis is separated from Madison and Alicia, and is then taken to a storage room where people are being executed for research. While there, he finds Nick with Luciana Galvez, who is injured. Travis tells Nick that his mother is looking for him. They briefly catch up with each other, before Troy finds Nick and asks about his ethnicity and whether his people dodged the outbreak or not. Before he can leave, Nick asks where his mother and sister are; Troy tells him they are fine. Travis tells Troy that Luciana is dying and needs medical attention. Troy says everyone dies there and tells Travis to take a seat. He refuses until Troy points a gun at him. When Travis is sitting, Steven (one of his associates) tells him his women are in danger. Travis tells Steven he is attracting attention, but Steven says he can get them out of there and just needs someone to watch his back. He is the only fit person left, and he can get them out if he has help. The guards come and take Travis, Nick, Luciana, Steven, and others before they can try to escape. Travis witnesses people being executed, but remains emotionless. He asks about the corpses outside. The hostile soldiers explain, but he berates them, calling them sick, calling their research pointless, and laughing at them. When one of the soldiers, Willy, decides to execute Nick, Travis volunteers. This gives Steven, Nick, and Luciana time cut off their cuffs. Travis manages to attack the soldiers, and escapes with the group. Outside, Steven, Nick, and Luciana go to the sewers, but Steven is killed by Willy and Travis is captured. Travis is taken to Troy, who sends him to the pit. He is thrown in a pit with the infected and, enraged by his treatment, kills them all. Then, Willy shoots an opening in a fence, releasing more. Travis runs towards the infected and kills them. After he is reunited with Madison, he tries attacking Troy, but is held back and sees the reunion of the Clarks. Later, Madison and Travis leave. Troy's older brother, Jake, tries persuading them to go to their ranch, but they refuse. In a brief moment, Madison comforts and apologizes to Travis, who is still in pain after the death of his son. As a herd breaks out, Madison and Nick go with Troy while Travis escapes via helicopter with Alicia, Luciana, Jake, and Charlene. They all head to the ranch.

Later that night, the helicopter is suddenly shot six times. Travis is hit with the last bullet, which enters his stomach and exits through his neck; he starts bleeding out. Travis begins unbuckling his seat belt, ignoring Alicia's concern over him doing so. He realizes he will die and, not wanting to turn, he tries to jump out but Alicia grabs him. He tells Alicia he has to and he does not want to turn, leaving Alicia no choice but to let him go, causing him to fall to his death. Travis appears in the final episode in Madison's dream sequence, through framed pictures in her house. After Madison is dragged into Jeremiah Otto's grave, Travis appears briefly in an effort to pull her out.

Development and reception

The season three episode "The New Frontier" features the death of Travis Manawa in the opening scene.

Showrunner Dave Erickson explained the decision to kill off Travis:

References

Characters created by Robert Kirkman
Fear the Walking Dead
Fictional characters from California
Television characters introduced in 2015
Fictional schoolteachers
Fictional Māori people
The Walking Dead (franchise) characters